Gerhardt Laves  (July 15, 1906 – March 14, 1993) was a graduate student at the University of Chicago and Yale University who between August 1929 and August 1931 undertook extensive fieldwork on Australian Aboriginal languages. Laves was probably the first person trained in modern linguistic fieldwork and analysis to study Australian languages. He intensively studied six languages: 'Kumbaingeri' (Gumbaynggir) in northern New South Wales; 'Karadjeri' (Karajarri) at Lagrange Bay, north-west Western Australia; 'Barda' (Bardi) at Cape Leveque, north-west Western Australia; 'Kurin' (Goreng) near Albany Western Australia; and 'Hermit Hill' (Matngele) and 'Ngengumeri (Ngan'gimerri) at Daly River Northern Territory. On the basis of his work Laves concluded that all Australian languages belong to a single language family.

After his fieldwork he returned to Chicago, married [1932] and followed his mentor, Edward Sapir, to Yale in New Haven, CT where he continued his graduate studies. Before completing his Ph.D. (which he never finished) he left Yale to be a teacher on the Navajo reservation at Shiprock, New Mexico. Several years later he returned to Chicago where he began a career with the International Harvester Company in Chicago. Laves never returned to linguistics or anthropology and only published two notes based on his work on Australian languages (listed below). His collection of materials from his fieldwork sat in storage until Mark Francillon (an anthropology student at the University of Chicago) heard about it and made contact with Laves in 1983. He arranged for the collection to be copied and deposited (as were the originals, sometime later) in the library at the Australian Institute of Aboriginal and Torres Strait Islander Studies. The collection of Aboriginal objects he acquired during his fieldwork in Australia is now held in the National Museum of Australia.

Laves' publications 
 Laves, Gerhardt. 1929a Words among Australian Aborigines, Science n.s. 70, no.1823 : Supplement, xiv.
 Laves, Gerhardt. 1929b Collecting native words, El Palacio 27(8/9), 290-1.

External links
Laves materials and biographical information
Laves obituary

1906 births
1993 deaths
Linguists of Australian Aboriginal languages
University of Chicago alumni
Yale University alumni
American educators
Linguists from the United States